Blood Lust is the second studio album by British band Uncle Acid and the Deadbeats. It was released in 2011 through Killer Candy Records, and later through Rise Above Records.

Background and production
Uncle Acid and the Deadbeats member Kevin Starrs initially placed the songs on MySpace and YouTube where they developed a fanbase who requested an album. For their first album, Volume I they created approximately 30 CD-R copies of the album and with the money made for those releases, the group put into recording Blood Lust with better recording equipment. The album was recorded in a friend of Starrs garage. Starrs mentioned that the band "really did fall apart when we made Blood Lust." At the end of recording, the remaining members were the drummer and Starrs.

Release
Like Volume 1, Blood Lust was initially released as a CD-R album with about 100 copies made. Blood Lust was re-released by Rise Above Records in 2011 on vinyl. Starrs stated that when Rise Above released the album, he regrouped new members for the band to continue work on future albums.

The album was released by Metal Blade Records on 20 November 2012.

Critical reception

AllMusic critic Eduardo Rivadavia was positive in his assessment of the album, stating that "none of this is exactly groundbreaking [...] but Uncle Acid & the Deadbeats make it work nonetheless on the strength of their convictions about this peculiar period and its music, ultimately proving yet again that great songs will always transcend the most recycled of building blocks."

Track listing
All songs written by K.R. Starrs.

References

External links
 

2011 albums
Uncle Acid & the Deadbeats albums
Metal Blade Records albums
Rise Above Records albums